Melodie Bosman (née Ngatai; born 25 June 1976) is a former New Zealand female rugby union player.

Bosman has represented several provincial sides; she first played 8 seasons for Waikato before playing for Auckland, Canterbury, Hawke's Bay, and Wellington.

Bosman made her international debut for the Black Ferns on 8 June 2004 against Canada at Vancouver. She was part of two successful Rugby World Cup campaigns when the Black Ferns won the 2006 and 2010 tournaments.

In 2013, Bosman played in the International Series against  winning all three games. She was appointed as Head Coach of the Tasman Mako in the Farah Palmer Cup in 2020.

References

External links
Black Ferns Profile

1976 births
Living people
New Zealand female rugby union players
New Zealand women's international rugby union players
Place of birth missing (living people)